The following highways are numbered 62:

Australia
 Kennedy Developmental Road - Queensland State Route 62

Canada
 Alberta Highway 62
British Columbia Highway 62
 Newfoundland and Labrador Route 62
 Highway 62 (Ontario)
 Winnipeg Route 62

India
 National Highway 62 (India)

Iran
 Road 62

Korea, South
National Route 62

New Zealand
 New Zealand State Highway 62

Philippines
 N62 highway (Philippines)

South Africa
Route 62 (South Africa)

United Kingdom
 A62 road
 M62 motorway

United States
 U.S. Route 62
 Alabama State Route 62
 Arizona State Route 62 (former)
 Arkansas Highway 62 (1926) (former)
 California State Route 62
 Colorado State Highway 62
 Delaware Route 62
 Florida State Road 62
 Georgia State Route 62
 Georgia State Route 62 (1926–1929) (former)
 Idaho State Highway 62
 Illinois Route 62
 Indiana State Road 62
 Iowa Highway 62
 K-62 (Kansas highway)
 Louisiana Highway 62
 Louisiana State Route 62 (former)
 Maryland Route 62
 Massachusetts Route 62
 M-62 (Michigan highway)
Minnesota: One of two Minnesota State Highway 62s:
 Minnesota State Highway 62 (Hennepin–Dakota counties)
 Minnesota State Highway 62 (Murray–Cottonwood counties)
 County Road 62 (Hennepin County, Minnesota)
Missouri Route 62 (1922) (former)
 Nebraska Highway 62
 Nebraska Recreation Road 62B
 Nebraska Recreation Road 62F
 Nevada State Route 62 (former)
 New Jersey Route 62
 County Route 62 (Bergen County, New Jersey)
New York:
 New York State Route 62 (1920s-1930) (former)
 New York State Route 62 (1930-1932) (former)
 County Route 62 (Cattaraugus County, New York)
County Route 62C (Cayuga County, New York)
 County Route 62 (Chemung County, New York)
 County Route 62 (Dutchess County, New York)
 County Route 62 (Erie County, New York)
 County Route 62 (Jefferson County, New York)
 County Route 62 (Livingston County, New York)
 County Route 62 (Orange County, New York)
 County Route 62 (Putnam County, New York)
 County Route 62 (Schenectady County, New York)
 County Route 62 (Suffolk County, New York)
 County Route 62 (Sullivan County, New York)
 County Route 62 (Warren County, New York)
 County Route 62 (Washington County, New York)
 County Route 62 (Westchester County, New York)
 County Route 62 (Wyoming County, New York)
 North Carolina Highway 62
 North Dakota Highway 62 (former)
 Ohio State Route 62 (1923) (former)
 Oklahoma State Highway 62 (former)
 Oregon Route 62
 Pennsylvania Route 62 (1920s) (former)
 Tennessee State Route 62
 Texas State Highway 62
 Texas State Highway Loop 62
 Texas State Highway Spur 62
 Farm to Market Road 62
 Texas Park Road 62
 Utah State Route 62
 Vermont Route 62
 Virginia State Route 62
 West Virginia Route 62
 Wisconsin Highway 62 (former)

Territories
 U.S. Virgin Islands Highway 62

See also
List of highways numbered 62A
A62